The NXT UK Women's Championship was a women's professional wrestling championship that was created and promoted by the American promotion WWE. It was defended on the NXT UK brand division, a sister brand of WWE's developmental territory NXT based in the United Kingdom. Established on 18 June 2018, the inaugural champion was Rhea Ripley. On 4 September 2022 at Worlds Collide, the title was unified into the NXT Women's Championship, officially retiring the title in the process, with Meiko Satomura recognized as the final champion.

History

In a press conference at The O2 Arena on 15 December 2016, the American professional wrestling promotion WWE announced plans to establish a United Kingdom-based brand on which professional wrestlers from the country would compete. A men's title, the WWE United Kingdom Championship (later renamed to NXT United Kingdom Championship), was established that same day, however, it was not until mid-2018 when NXT UK was formally established as the United Kingdom-based brand, and sister brand of the American-based NXT. On 18 June during the first night of the 2018 United Kingdom Championship Tournament, the NXT UK Women's Championship, along with the NXT UK Tag Team Championship, was announced for the NXT UK brand. Afterwards, a two-day eight-woman single-elimination tournament was scheduled to crown the inaugural champion during the first tapings of NXT UK. During the 26 August tapings, Rhea Ripley defeated Toni Storm in the tournament final to become the inaugural NXT UK Women's Champion (aired 28 November).

In January 2020, WWE briefly began referring to the women's championship as the "NXT UK Championship" to bring it on an equal level as the men's title, though reverted to calling it the NXT UK Women's Championship soon after; it remained as NXT UK Women's Championship on the official title history during this time.

In August 2022, WWE announced that the NXT UK brand would go on hiatus and would relaunch as NXT Europe in 2023. As such, NXT UK's championships were unified into their respective NXT championship counterparts. Subsequently, the NXT UK Women's Championship was retired on 4 September 2022 at Worlds Collide. At the event, Mandy Rose defeated Blair Davenport and reigning NXT UK Women's Champion Meiko Satomura in a triple threat match to unify the NXT UK Women's Championship into Rose's NXT Women's Championship, with Satomura recognized as the final NXT UK Women's Champion. Rose went forward as the unified NXT Women's Champion.

Inaugural tournament

Championship belt design 

The championship belt was revealed during the 25 August 2018 tapings of NXT UK. It was nearly identical to its male counterpart, the NXT United Kingdom Championship. Like the United Kingdom Championship, the center plate was modeled after the United Kingdom's royal coat of arms, featuring a lion and a horse (instead of the traditional unicorn) on either side of the arms, while at the center of the plate featured a shield with the NXT UK logo; atop the shield were the crown jewels. Above the arms was a banner that read "United Kingdom", directly below the shield was a banner that read "Women's", and below that was a banner that read "Champion". Gold divider bars separated the center plate from the belt's two side plates. In what became a prominent feature for WWE's championship belts, the two side plates featured removable center sections that could be replaced with the reigning champion's logo; the default side plates featured the WWE logo on a red globe. Like the Raw and SmackDown Women's Championship belts, the strap was white and smaller than the men's.

Reigns

Over the championship's four-year history, there were four reigns between four champions. Rhea Ripley was the inaugural champion and was also the youngest champion when she won the title at the age of 21, while Meiko Satomura was the oldest at 41 and is recognized as the final champion. Kay Lee Ray had the longest reign, which WWE recognizes as lasting 649 days (beginning 31 August 2019 and ending 10 June 2021); the actual length of her reign is undeterminable as the real date she lost the title is unknown. Ripley had the shortest reign at 139 days (44 days as recognized by WWE due to tape delay).

Notes

References

External links 

 NXT UK Women's Title History

WWE NXT championships
National professional wrestling championships
Championship
WWE women's championships